All You Need Is Crime is a 2019 Italian comedy film directed by Massimiliano Bruno.

Plot 
Three friends in Rome in 2018 make ends meet creating a "criminal tour" for the places that were the theater of the deeds of the Banda della Magliana, complete with vintage clothes. Suddenly, however, they are catapulted in 1982, during the 1982 FIFA World Cup, being faced with the real criminal Banda della Magliana, which at the time ran clandestine betting on soccer.

Cast 
 Alessandro Gassmann as Sebastiano
 Marco Giallini as Moreno
 Edoardo Leo as Renatino 
 Gianmarco Tognazzi as Giuseppe
 Ilenia Pastorelli as Sabrina
 Massimiliano Bruno as Gianfranco
 Antonello Fassari as Giuseppe's father in law
 Emanuel Bevilacqua as Bove

Influences
The director Massimiliano Bruno stated he was influenced by Italian 1970–80s gangster movies and sexy comedies. The time travel plot was inspired by the 1984 comedy Nothing Left to Do But Cry, hence the Italian title Non ci resta che il crimine ("Nothing left to do but crime").

See also 
 List of time travel science fiction films
 Nothing Left to Do But Cry

References

External links 

2019 films
2010s parody films
Mafia films
Italian parody films
Films about time travel
Films directed by Massimiliano Bruno
Films set in Rome
Films set in 1982
Films set in 2018
2010s Italian-language films
2010s Italian films